The National Public Security Force was created in 2004 and is headquartered in Brasília, in the Federal District, as a joint cooperation of various Brazilian Public Safety forces, co-ordinated by the National Secretariat of Public Security ( - SENASP), of the Ministry of Justice. It is an agency that was created during the administration of  President Luiz Inácio Lula da Silva, a concept developed by then Minister of Justice, Márcio Thomaz Bastos.

The National Force is composed of the most qualified Civil and Military Police personnel, Military Firefighters and experts loaned from each of the states of Brazil. It is deployed in cases of major security crisis to augment local security forces by the request of local authorities.

Command 

The Secretary of the SENASP, Police Commissioner of the Brazilian Federal Police, Luiz Fernando Correa, is in overall charge of the Force, while the Colonel of the Military Police of Acre, José Américo de Souza Gaia, has operational and direct control of the force.

Training 

The National Force is composed of men of the Brazilian Military Police of the various states of Brazil, in coordination with the Secretary of Public Security of each different Brazilian state.

Law enforcement officers receive initially 100 hours of further education, divided in ten days of training. There are classes in human rights, control of civil riots, ostensive policing, crisis management and shooting techniques.

BEPE

The BEPE or Batalhão Especial de Pronto Emprego (Quick Deployment Special Battalion) is the elite unit of National Public Security Force. It is headquartered in Gama, in the Federal District. Its training with elite units of Brazil and abroad allows BEPE to be effectively suited for patrol or police special operations anywhere in the country. The BEPE was established by the Ministry of Justice as the leading and best-trained unit within the Brazilian police to act in emergency situations concerning public safety when the state law enforcement agencies request federal intervention. Urgency, that can be quickly answered, as his quota is effective and not demobilizable, remains in readiness to meet by Situation critical in public safety.

Operations

On different occasions, the National Force was called in the state of Espírito Santo as well as in the state of Mato Grosso do Sul, primarily to help containing rebellions inside prisons. On another occasion, the federal government offered to send the National Force to assist the state of São Paulo against acts of violence organized there, in 2006, again by prisoners against the state public safety forces, but the federal government offer was refused by the state government, as the state claimed control over the prisoners.

The governor of the state of Rio de Janeiro, Sérgio Cabral Filho asked for support from the National Public Security Force back in 2007 when the state suffered from a wave of attacks by several criminal factions. The Federal Government agreed to send a contingent of about 500 men and 52 vehicles to patrol 19 critical points within the state, primarily within the area of ''favelas.

The FNSP was called into action in the states of Santa Catarina, Minas Gerais and Bahia in 2013, and in Pernambuco in 2014. In these cases, the force provided strict security measures in these states. It reinforced local police work in Teresina, Piaui, in 2015. In 2016, aside from security duties at the 2016 Rio Summer Olympics and the city elections there, detachments of the force were deployed to Rio Grande do Sul and Maranhão, and in the fall of 2017 in Espírito Santo.

Vehicles

Weapons

See also
Policing in Brazil
Military police
Military of Brazil
Brazilian Civil Police
Batalhão de Operações Policiais Especiais
Complexo do Alemão massacre

References

Law enforcement in Brazil
F
Gendarmerie
Specialist police agencies of Brazil